Gazoz was an Israeli pop rock band, which operated originally from 1978 to 1979. Two of the members had previously played together in the band Kaveret. Most of the band's songs were radio hits, among which were “Rony”, “Danny And Mummy”, “Spaceship”, “Tea Makes Me Dizzy” and “Nine O'Clock At The Circle.”

Israeli pop music groups
Israeli rock music groups
Musical groups established in 1978